is a special ward in Tokyo, Japan. It is also the name of a neighborhood and administrative district within the ward. The ward calls itself Setagaya City in English. Its official bird is the azure-winged magpie, its flower is the fringed orchid, and its tree is the Zelkova serrata.

Setagaya has the largest population and second-largest area (after Ōta) of Tokyo's special wards. As of January 1, 2020, the ward has an estimated population of 939,099, and a population density of 16,177 persons per square kilometre with the total area of 58.06 km2.

Geography
Setagaya is located at the southwestern corner of the Tokyo's special wards and the Tama River separates the boundary between Tokyo Metropolis and Kanagawa Prefecture.

Residential population is among the highest in Tokyo as there are many residential neighbourhoods within Setagaya. Setagaya is served by various rail services providing frequent two- to three-minute headway rush-hour services to the busiest train terminals of Shinjuku and Shibuya as well as through service trains which continue travelling on to the Tokyo Metro lines providing direct access to the central commercial and business districts. Most rail lines run parallel from east to west and there are no north to south rail services within Setagaya, except for Setagaya Line light rail.

The ward is divided into five districts. These are Setagaya, Kitazawa, Tamagawa, Kinuta and Karasuyama. The main ward office and municipal assembly (city hall) is located in Setagaya District, but other districts also have their own branch ward offices as a part of the administrative structure. Each branch office provides almost identical services as the main office, but does not provide the services related to municipal assembly.

Most of the land is in the Musashino Tableland. The parts along the Tama River to the south are comparatively low-lying.

History
The special ward of Setagaya was founded on March 15, 1947.

During the Edo period, 42 villages occupied the area. With the abolition of the han system in 1871, the central and eastern portions became part of Tokyo Prefecture while the rest became part of Kanagawa Prefecture; in 1893, some areas were transferred to Tokyo Prefecture. With the establishment of Setagaya Ward (an ordinary ward) in the old Tokyo City in 1932, and further consolidation in 1936, Setagaya took its present boundaries.

During the 1964 Summer Olympics, the district of Karasuyama-machi in Setagaya was part of the athletics marathon and 50 km walk event.

Landmarks

Nature
Tama River
Todoroki Valley (Yazawa River)

Parks
Futako Tamagawa Park
Hanegi Park
Kinuta Park
Kitami Friendship Square
Komazawa Olympic Park
Roka Kōshun-en
Okura Sports Park
Setagaya Park
Soshigaya Park
Tamagawa Nogemachi Park
Tokyo Equestrian Park

Cultural facilities
Gotoh Museum
Hasegawa Machiko Art Museum
Honda Theater
Oya Soichi Bunko, a private library of Japanese magazines for researchers and journalists
Setagaya Art Museum
Setagaya Literary Museum

Religious facilities
Gōtoku-ji, a Zen temple known as birthplace of maneki-neko, with grave of Ii Naosuke who was assassinated in the Sakuradamon Incident in 1860
Shōin shrine
Jōshin-ji (Kuhonbutsu)
Catholic Seta Church, Seta Monastery
Zenyōmitsu-ji
Todoroki Fudōson

Others
Carrot Tower
NHK Science & Technology Research Laboratories
Setagaya Business Square (SBS)
Setagaya Castle ruins
Tokyo Metropolitan Matsuzawa Hospital

Districts

Karasuyama Area

 Hachimanyama
 Kamikitazawa
 Kamisoshigaya
 Kitakarasuyama
 Kasuya
 Kyūden
 Minamikarasuyama

Kinuta Area

 Chitosedai
 Funabashi
 Kamata
 Kinuta
 Kinutakōen
 Kitami
 Okamoto
 Ōkura
 Seijō
 Soshigaya
 Unane

Kitazawa Area

 Akatsutsumi
 Daita
 Daizawa
 Gōtokuji
 Hanegi
 Ikejiria
 Kitazawa (including Shimokitazawa)
 Matsubara
 Ōhara
 Sakurajōsui
 Umegaoka

Setagaya Area

 Shimouma
 Ikejirib
 Kamiuma
 Komazawac
 Kyōdō
 Mishuku
 Miyasaka
 Nozawa
 Sakura
 Sakuragaoka
 Sangenjaya
 Setagaya
 Taishidō
 Tsurumaki
 Wakabayashi

Tamagawa Area

 Fukazawa
 Higashitamagawa
 Kaminoge
 Kamiyōga
 Komazawad
 Komazawakōen
 Nakamachi
 Noge
 Okusawa
 Oyamadai
 Sakurashinmachi
 Seta
 Shinmachi
 Tamazutsumi
 Tamagawa
 Tamagawadai
 Tamagawa-Den'enchōfu
 Todoroki
 Yōga
 Futako-Tamagawa

Notes:
a – 4-chōme (33-ban to 39-ban)
b – 1, 2, 3-chōme, 4-chōme (1-ban to 32-ban)
c – 1, 2-chōme
d – 3, 4-chōme

Transportation

Rail
Keio Corporation
Keiō Line: Daitabashi, Meidai-mae, Shimo Takaido, Sakura Josui, Kami Kitazawa, Hachiman Yama, Roka Koen, Chitose-Karasuyama Stations
Keio Inokashira Line: Ikenoue, Shimo-Kitazawa, Shindaita, Higashi-Matsubara, Meidaimae Stations
Odakyu Electric Railway
Tokyu Corporation
Den-en-toshi Line: Ikejiri Ohashi, Sangen-Jaya, Komazawa Daigaku, Sakura Shinmachi, Yōga, Futako-Tamagawa Stations
Meguro Line: Okusawa Station
Oimachi Line: Midorigaoka, (Jiyūgaoka), Kuhon-butsu, Oyamadai, Todoroki, Kaminoge, Futako-Tamagawa Stations
Setagaya Line (LRT): Sangen-Jaya, Nishi Taishido, Wakabayashi, Shoin Jinja-mae, Setagaya, Kami Machi, Miyanosaka, Yamashita, Matsubara, Shimo Takaido Stations
Toyoko Line: (Jiyūgaoka Station)

Road

Expressways
  Tōmei Expressway
  Chūō Expressway
  Daisan Keihin Road (part of National Route 466)
 Shuto Expressway 
  No. 3 Shibuya Route
  No. 4 Shinjuku Route

National highways
 National Route 20 "Kōshū Kaidō"
 National Route 246 "Tamagawa Dōri"
 National Route 466

Prefecture roads
 Tokyo Metropolitan Road 3 "Setagaya Dōri"
 Tokyo Metropolitan Road 311 "Kampachi Dōri"
 Tokyo Metropolitan Road 312 "Meguro Dōri"
 Tokyo Metropolitan Road 318 "Kan-nana Dōri"
 Tokyo Metropolitan Road 416 "Komazawa Dōri"

Politics
On April 25, 2011, amid national concern over the safety of nuclear power triggered by the March 11 earthquake and Fukushima I nuclear accidents, former Social Democratic Party Upper House House of Councillors legislator Nobuto Hosaka was elected mayor on an anti-nuclear platform. Prior to becoming mayor, Hosaka was also well known for his staunch opposition of the death penalty and his defense of Japan's Otaku culture.

Economy

 Rakuten has its headquarters building "Rakuten Crimson House" in Setagaya.
 Toho has studio facilities in Setagaya.
 OLM, Inc. has its studios in Setagaya.
 Ivan Ramen restaurant: a ramen shop owned by an American chef.

Education

Higher education

 Central Theological College, Tokyo
 Japan Women's College of Physical Education
 Kokushikan University
 Komazawa University
 Nihon University
 Nippon Sport Science University
 Sanno Institute of Management
 Seijo University
 Showa Women's University
 Tama Art University Kaminoge Campus
 Temple University Japan Campus
 Tokyo City University
 Tokyo Healthcare University Setagaya Campus
 Tokyo University of Agriculture

Primary and secondary education

National schools
These are schools operated by agencies of the central Government of Japan.

 Tokyo Gakugei University 
  
 Komaba, University of Tsukuba
 Setagaya Elementary School attached to Tokyo Gakugei University (東京学芸大学附属世田谷小学校)

Metropolitan senior high schools
The Tokyo Metropolitan Government Board of Education operates following senior high schools in Setagaya.

 
 
 
 
 
 
 
 
 
 Tokyo Metropolitan Setagaya Technical High School
 Tokyo Metropolitan Tamagawa High School

Municipal junior high schools
The  operates 29 junior high schools in Setagaya.

They are:

 Chitose Junior High School (千歳中学校)
 Fuji Junior High School (富士中学校)
 Fukasawa Junior High School (深沢中学校)
 Funabashi Kibo Junior High School (船橋希望中学校)
 Higashi Fukasawa Junior High School (東深沢中学校)
 Kamisoshigaya Junior High School (上祖師谷中学校)
 Karasuyama Junior High School (烏山中学校)
 Kinuta Junior High School (砧中学校)
 Kinuta Minami Junior High School (砧南中学校)
 Kitami Junior High School (喜多見中学校)
 Kitazawa Junior High School (北沢中学校)
 Komadome Junior High School (駒留中学校)
 Komazawa Junior High School (駒沢中学校)
 Matsuzawa Junior High School (松沢中学校)
 Midorigaoka Junior High School (緑丘中学校)
 Mishuku Junior High School (三宿中学校)
 Osukawa Junior High School (奥沢中学校)
 Oyamadai Junior High School (尾山台中学校)
 Roka Junior High School (芦花中学校)
 Sakuragaoka Junior High School (桜丘中学校)
 Sakuragi Junior High School (桜木中学校)
 Seta Junior High School (瀬田中学校)
 Setagaya Junior High School (世田谷中学校)
 Taishido Junior High School (太子堂中学校)
 Tamagawa Junior High School (玉川中学校)
 Tsurumaki Junior High School (弦巻中学校)
 Umegaoka Junior High School (梅丘中学校)
 Yahata Junior High School (八幡中学校)
 Yoga Junior High School (用賀中学校)

Former schools:

 Funabashi Junior High School (船橋中学校)
 Ikejiri Junior High School (池尻中学校)
 Kibogaoka Junior High School (希望丘中学校)
 Wakabayashi Junior High School (若林中学校)
 Yamazaki Junior High School (山崎中学校)

Municipal elementary schools

The Setagaya City Board of Education operates 61 elementary schools in Setagaya.

They are:

 Akazutsumi Elementary School (赤堤小学校)
 Asahi Elementary School (旭小学校)
 Chitose Elementary School (千歳小学校)
 Chitosedai Elementary School (千歳台小学校)
 Daita Elementary School (代田小学校)
 Daizawa Elementary School (代沢小学校)
 Fukasawa Elementary School (深沢小学校)
 Funabashi Elementary School (船橋小学校)
 Futako Tamagawa Elementary School (二子玉川小学校)
 Hachimanyama Elementary School (八幡山小学校)
 Higashi Fukasawa Elementary School (東深沢小学校)
 Higashi Tamagawa Elementary School (東玉川小学校)
 Kamikitazawa Elementary School (上北沢小学校)
 Karasuyama Elementary School (烏山小学校)
 Karasuyama Kita Elementary School (烏山北小学校)
 Kibogaoka Elementary School (希望丘小学校)
 Kinuta Elementary School (砧小学校)
 Kinuta Minami Elementary School (砧南小学校)
 Kitami Elementary School (喜多見小学校)
 Komatsunagi Elementary School (駒繋小学校)
 Komazawa Elementary School (駒沢小学校)
 Kuhonbutsu Elementary School (九品仏小学校)
 Kyodo Elementary School (経堂小学校)
 Kyosai Elementary School (京西小学校)
 Kyuden Elementary School (給田小学校)
 Ikejiri Elementary School (池尻小学校)
 Ikenoue Elementary School (池之上小学校)
 Matsubara Elementary School (松原小学校)
 Matsugaoka Elementary School (松丘小学校)
 Matsuzawa Elementary School (松沢小学校)
 Meisei Elementary School (明正小学校)
 Mishuku Elementary School (三宿小学校)
 Musashigaoka Elementary School (武蔵丘小学校)
 Nakamachi Elementary School (中町小学校)
 Nakamaru Elementary School (中丸小学校)
 Nakazato Elementary School (中里小学校)
 Okusawa Elementary School (奥沢小学校)
 Oyamadai Elementary School (尾山台小学校)
 Roka Elementary School (芦花小学校)
 Sakura Elementary School (桜小学校)
 Sakuragaoka Elementary School (桜丘小学校)
 Sakuramachi Elementary School (桜町小学校)
 Sangenjaya Elementary School (三軒茶屋小学校)
 Sasahara Elementary School (笹原小学校)
 Seta Elementary School (瀬田小学校)
 Setagaya Elementary School (世田谷小学校)
 Shimokitazawa Elementary School (下北沢小学校)
 Shiroyama Elementary School (城山小学校)
 Soshigaya Elementary School (祖師谷小学校)
 Taishido Elementary School (太子堂小学校)
 Tamagawa Elementary School (玉川小学校)
 Tamazutsumi Elementary School (玉堤小学校)
 Tamon Elementary School (多聞小学校)
 Todoroki Elementary School (等々力小学校)
 Tsukado Elementary School (塚戸小学校)
 Tsurumaki Elementary School (弦巻小学校)
 Wakabayashi Elementary School (若林小学校)
 Yahata Elementary School (八幡小学校)
 Yamazaki Elementary School (山崎小学校)
 Yamano Elementary School (山野小学校)
 Yoga Elementary School (用賀小学校)

Former schools:
 Hanamido Elementary School (花見堂小学校)
 Higashi Ohara Elementary School (東大原小学校)
 Kitazawa Elementary School (北沢小学校)
 Moriyama Elementary School (守山小学校)

Private secondary schools

 Daito Gakuen High School
 Den-en Chofu Gakuen Junior & Senior High School
 Denenchofufutaba Gakuen Junior and Senior High School
 Japan Women's College of Physical Education Nikaido High School
 Japan Women's University affiliated Homei High School and Junior High School
 Kagaku Gijutsu Gakuen High School
 Keisen Jogakuen High School
 Kokushikan Senior High School and Kokushikan Junior High School
 Komaba Gakuen High School
 Komaba Toho Junior and Senior High School
 Komazawa University Senior High School
 Kosei Gakuen Girls' High School
 
 Meguro Seibi Gakuen Junior & Senior High School
 MITA International School
 Nihon Gakuen Junior and Senior High School
 Nihon University Sakuragaoka High School
 
 St. Dominic's Junior and Senior High School
 Seijo Gakuen Junior High School and High School
 Setagaya Gakuen School
 Shimokitazawa Seitoku Senior High School
 Shoin University Shoin Junior and Senior High School
 Showa Women's University Junior-Senior High School
 Tamagawa Seigakuin Girls' Junior & Senior High School
 Tokyo City University Junior and Senior High School
 Tokyo City University Todoroki Junior and Senior High School
 Tokyo University of Agriculture First High School and Junior High School

Private elementary schools

 Denenchofufutaba Gakuen Elementary School
 Kunimoto Elementary School
 St. Dominic's Elementary School
 Seijo Gakuen Elementary School
 Showa Women's University Showa Elementary School
 Tokyo City University Elementary School
 Wako Elementary School

Special education schools

 Tokyo Metropolitan Komyo Gakuen
 Tokyo Metropolitan Kugayama Blind School
 Tokyo Metropolitan Seicho Special Support School

International schools

 St. Mary's International School
 Seisen International School
 British School in Tokyo Showa Campus at Showa Women's University
 Tokyo International Progressive School

Former international schools:
  – North Korean school

International relations

Sister cities
Setagaya has sister-city relationships with Winnipeg, Manitoba in Canada; the Döbling district of Vienna, Austria; and Bunbury, Western Australia.

Diplomatic missions in Setagaya

  Embassy of the Republic of Angola
  Embassy of the Republic of Cameroon
  Embassy of Mozambique
  Embassy of Rwanda
  Embassy of Tanzania
  Honorary Consulate-General of the Central African Republic in Tokyo
  Honorary Consulate-General of the Republic of Malta in Tokyo

Notable people from Setagaya
 Yasuo Fukuda, Politician, 91st Prime Minister
 Akiko Santō, Politician, 32nd President of the House of Councillors
 Fusako Shigenobu, Terrorist, leader of the Japanese Red Army
 Fighting Harada, World boxing champion
 Akiko Kojima, Miss Universe 1959
 Nobuyuki Idei, Former CEO of Sony
 Akihiko Hoshide, Astronaut
 Kuniko Mukōda, Screenwriter, Novelist, Essayist
 Kōki Mitani, Playwright, Screenwriter, Theatre director
 Shirō Sagisu, Composer
 Kiichi Nakai, Actor
 Yoshino Kimura, Actress
 Eiko Koike, Actress
 Sayaka Kanda, Singer, Actress
 Kaz Hayashi, Professional wrestler
 Shota Umino, Professional wrestler
 Hideo Kojima, Video game designer best known as the creator of the Metal Gear franchise
 Satoshi Tajiri, Video game designer and director best known as the creator of the Pokémon media franchise
 Noritake Kinashi, Comedian, actor, singer, artist and J-Pop idol, member of comedy duo Tunnels and former member of J-pop group Yaen
 Yoshinori Muto, International footballer
 Mika Kanai, Voice actress
 Rei Sakuma, Voice actress
 Shino Kakinuma, Voice actress
 Ichirou Mizuki, Singer, voice actor
 Yuki Kunii, Motorcycle racer
 Mariko Kawana, Porn actress, erotic novelist, human rights activist
 Matt Kuwata, Model, musician, media personality

See also 

Setagaya family murder

References

External links

Setagaya City Official Website 

 
Venues of the 1964 Summer Olympics
Olympic athletics venues
Wards of Tokyo